David Austick (8 March 1920 – 9 February 1997) was a British Liberal Party politician and bookshop owner.

At a by-election in July 1973 caused by the death of the sitting Conservative MP Sir Malcolm Stoddart-Scott, Austick was elected Member of Parliament (MP) for Ripon in the West Riding of Yorkshire, gaining the seat from the Conservatives by a majority of 946 votes. However, it was a short-lived success.  In the February 1974 general election, Austick lost by 4,335 votes to the new Conservative candidate Keith Hampson after seven months as an MP.

Austick was never again elected an MP, but he also served as a district and county councillor in Yorkshire and was one time Chairman of the Liberal Candidates' Association. He later became Executive Chairman of the Electoral Reform Society.

See also
List of United Kingdom MPs with the shortest service

References 

Times Guide to the House of Commons October 1974

External links 
 
 Examples of Austick's election material

1920 births
1997 deaths
Liberal Party (UK) MPs for English constituencies
Councillors in Leeds
UK MPs 1970–1974